Birkdale railway station is located on the Cleveland line in Queensland, Australia. It serves the suburb of Birkdale in Redland City.

History
In 1889, the Cleveland line was extended from Manly to the original Cleveland station.

Birkdale station opened in 1889 at the same time as the line. On 1 November 1960, the station closed when the line was truncated to Lota. The station reopened on 26 July 1986 as the line was being rebuilt to Cleveland.

Services
Birkdale is served by Cleveland line services from Shorncliffe, Northgate, Doomben and Bowen Hills to Cleveland.

Services by platform

Transport links
Transdev Queensland operate two routes from Birkdale station:
254: Capalaba to Wellington Point
255: to Cleveland via Wellington Point

References

External links

Birkdale station Queensland Rail
Birkdale station Queensland's Railways on the Internet
[ Birkdale station] TransLink travel information

Railway stations in Australia opened in 1889
Railway stations in Redland City